Peadus is a genus of snout moths.

Species
 Peadus bolivianus (Neunzig, 1989) (from Bolivia)
Peadus burdettella (Schaus, 1913) (syn. Peadus semproniella (Schaus, 1913))
Peadus dissitus Heinrich 1956
Peadus subaquilella (Ragonot, 1888)

References

Phycitini